Sean Egan is a software engineer at Google, where he worked on Google Talk and is currently working on Google Maps. He is the former project leader of Pidgin, a popular instant messaging client.  He is also the author of the book Open Source Messaging Application Development: Building and Extending Gaim.

Biography 
Born on April 5, 1982, in Long Island, New York, Sean Egan graduated from Chaminade High School in Mineola, New York and earned his Bachelor of Science degree at Binghamton University with a major in computer science.

He has been a major contributor to the field of open-source real-time communication software since 2000, when he started working on Pidgin, an open-source, multi-protocol, cross-platform instant messaging application. Sean Egan became an official part of the Pidgin team in January 2001 and was maintainer of Pidgin from early 2002 until April 2008 when he announced his retirement.

He was hired by Google, Inc. in September 2005 as a software engineer on the Google Talk team. As a leader of the libjingle project, Sean Egan is focusing his efforts on ensuring interoperability in the voice features of XMPP-based instant messaging clients.

Published works 
 Egan, Sean M. Open Source Messaging Application Development: Building and Extending Gaim, Berkeley, CA: Apress, 2005. .

See also 
 Pidgin
 Google Talk

References

External links
 seanegan Egan's user page at the Pidgin Instant Messaging Client website
 Speaker Profile, O'Reilly Emerging Telephony Conference

News media 
 
  
 
 
 

Free software programmers
American software engineers
Google employees
Binghamton University alumni
1982 births
Living people
People from Long Island